Conus vanvilstereni is a species of sea snail, a marine gastropod mollusk in the family Conidae, the cone snails, cone shells or cones.

These snails are predatory and venomous. They are capable of "stinging" humans.

Description
The size of the shell attains 43 mm.

Distribution
This marine species occurs in the Sulu Sea, Philippines

References

Bibliography
 Robert Moolenbeek and Arnold Zandbergen, Kioconus vanvilstereni, a new species from the Philippines (Gastropoda: Conidae); Miscellanea Malacologia 6(3)

External links
 To World Register of Marine Species
 Cone Shells - Knights of the Sea
 

vanvilstereni
Gastropods described in 2013